Vinculinula diehli is a moth in the family Bombycidae. It was described by Wolfgang Dierl in 1978. It is found on Sumatra.

The wingspan is 24–27 mm. The ground colour is violet grey with brown markings.

References

Bombycidae
Moths described in 1978